The 2nd Infantry Division "Sforzesca" was a infantry division of the Royal Italian Army during World War II. The Sforzesca was classified as a mountain infantry division, which meant that the division's artillery was moved by pack mules instead of the horse-drawn carriages of line infantry divisions. Italy's real mountain warfare divisions were the six alpine divisions manned by Alpini mountain troops. The Division, with the exception of the 53rd Infantry Regiment based in Biella, was based in Novara and recruited its troops primarily from northern Piedmont. The division was named for the Battle of Sforzesca fought during the First Italian War of Independence in 1849.

History 
The division's lineage begins with the Brigade "Umbria" established in Palermo on 16 April 1861 with the 53rd and 54th infantry regiments.

World War I 
The brigade fought on the Italian front in World War I. On 1 October 1926 the brigade assumed the name of II Infantry Brigade and received the 68th Infantry Regiment "Palermo" from the disbanded Brigade "Palermo". The brigade was the infantry component of the 2nd Territorial Division of Novara, which also included the 17th Artillery Regiment. In 1934 the division changed its name to 2nd Infantry Division "Sforzesca". On 25 April 1939 the II Infantry Brigade was dissolved and the three infantry regiments came under direct command of the division, and the 53rd and 54th infantry regiments and 17th Artillery Regiment changed their names to "Sforzesca". On 24 May 1939 the division ceded the 68th Infantry Regiment "Palermo" to the newly activated 58th Infantry Division "Legnano".

World War II

Invasion of France 
The Sforzesca participated in the invasion of France operating between Claviere and Cesana Torinese. It spearheaded the attack in the direction of Briançon, but encountered heavy French resistance. On 22 June 1940 the area around the Fort Bois de Praria was secured, and fighting shifted to Bois de Sestriere, with the capture of Montgenèvre commune. On the southern flank, the advance stalled at La Crete (Crete de Chaussard). On 23 June 23 the Sforzesca has made a very modest advance. In the night of 23 to 24 June 1940 the Sforzesca was transferred to the reserve and replaced by the 58th Infantry Division "Legnano".

Greco-Italian War 
During the Greco-Italian War the Sforzesca was sent as reinforcement to Albania between 12–18 January 1941. There the 30th CC.NN. Legion was attached to the division, which entered the front in the area of Tepelenë. The Sforzesca had its first encounter with Greek army forces on 28 January on the ridge over Mali i Shendellise (Scindeli). The heavy defensive fighting, with frequent hand-to-hand combat and positions lost and recaptured several times, continued until 28 February. During the Italian offensive on 1 March 1941, the Sforzesca captured Chiaf and by 4 March, it had moved to Bregu i Buzit. After the Battle of Greece the Sforzesca remained in on occupation duty in Greece until the middle of July 1941.

Eastern Front 
The Sforzesca was one of the ten Italian divisions of the Italian Army in Russia, which fought on the Eastern Front. After arriving in Ukraine the division was assigned to XXXV Army Corps and participated in the capture of the Ivanovka positions in Dnipropetrovsk Oblast. On 14 July 1942 the Sforzesca reached Fashchivka in Luhansk Oblast. By 18 July 1942 the Sforzesca division started mop-up operation near Krasnyi Luch. At beginning of August 1942 the division marched to the area north of Serafimovich, establishing a bridgehead on the eastern bank of the Don river up to Khutor of Yarskoy 1-y. Together with 3rd Cavalry Division "Principe Amedeo Duca d'Aosta", the  Sforzesca beat off several Soviet attacks from 12 August 1942 to 1 September 1942.

Although Soviet attacks were stopped, the Italians were unable to resume their offensive or expand their bridgehead as a result. After repositioning on the southern bank of the Don, the Sforzesca was assigned to the Romanian 3rd Army, along with the 9th Infantry Division "Pasubio" and 3rd Cavalry Division "Principe Amedeo Duca d'Aosta". The Sforzesca was under heavy Soviet attacks from 20 November until 28 November 1942.

Operation Little Saturn 
On 12 December 1942 Soviet forces began Operation Little Saturn and on 22 December large columns of Soviet tanks overran the Sforzesca and part of the division was destroyed, largely as a result of conflicting German orders, that caught the Italian division advancing forward near Verkhne-Chirskoy, when it should've been retreating to the new German defensive line near the Chir River. The remnants of the Sforzesca fought a defensive battle in the village of Kranoyarovka, Rostov Oblast from 25 December 1942 until 28 December 1942. The division suffered heavy losses in January 1943, and the remaining units managed to break through the encirclement by the Soviet 1st Guards Army on 3 January 1943. The remnants of the division were repatriated in March 1943.

Italy 
The Sforzesca and its units were disbanded in on 31 May 1943, but on 1 June 1943 the division was reformed with its traditional units by renaming the 157th Infantry Division "Novara" and that division's units. The new Sforzesca was based in Divača, Sežana and Ilirska Bistrica along the border between Italy and Yugoslavia, where it performed anti-partisan duties. After the announcement of the Armistice of Cassibile on 8 September 1943 the remnants of the Sforzesca surrendered to invading German forces on 9 September 1943.

Organization 

When the division was deployed to the Soviet Union it consisted of the following units:

  2nd Infantry Division "Sforzesca", in Novara
 53rd Infantry Regiment "Sforzesca", in Biella
 Command Company
 3x Fusilier battalions
 Support Weapons Company (65/17 infantry support guns)
 Mortar Company (81mm Mod. 35 mortars)
 54th Infantry Regiment "Sforzesca", in Novara
 Command Company
 3x Fusilier battalions
 Support Weapons Company (65/17 infantry support guns)
 Mortar Company (81mm Mod. 35 mortars)
 17th Artillery Regiment "Sforzesca", in Novara
 Command Unit
 I Group (105/28 guns)
 II Group (75/18 Mod. 35 howitzers)
 III Group (75/18 Mod. 35 howitzers)
 53rd Anti-aircraft Battery (20/65 Mod. 35 anti-aircraft guns)
 302nd Anti-aircraft Battery (20/65 Mod. 35 anti-aircraft guns)
 Ammunition and Supply Unit
 II Anti-tank Battalion (formed during the deployment to the Eastern Front)
 2nd Anti-tank Company (47/32 anti-tank guns)
 70th Anti-tank Battery (75/39 anti-tank guns; attached during the deployment in the Soviet Union)
 121st Anti-tank Company (47/32 anti-tank guns; attached for the deployment to the Soviet Union)
 II Mortar Battalion (81mm Mod. 35 mortars)
 2nd Telegraph and Radio Operators Company
 16th Engineer Company
 1st Supply Section (expanded to 1st Supply Unit for the deployment to the Soviet Union)
 6th Medical Section
 5th Field Hospital
 6th Field Hospital
 7th Field Hospital
 805th Field Hospital
 27th Surgical Unit
 2nd Truck Section
 124th Transport Section
 192nd Transport Section
 2nd Bakers Section
 4th Carabinieri Section
 5th Carabinieri Section
 2nd Infantry Division Command Transport Squad
 69th Field Post Office

Attached from 27 December 1940 to April 1942:
 30th CC.NN. Legion "Oddone"
 Command Company
 VI CC.NN. Battalion
 XXX CC.NN. Battalion
 30th CC.NN. Machine Gun Company

After the division reconstitution through the renaming of the 157th Infantry Division "Novara" the new Sforzesca inherited the following units from the Novara:

 CLVII Machine Gun Battalion
 CLVII Mixed Engineer Battalion
 157th Medical Section
 157th Carabinieri Section
 157th Field Post Office

Military honors 
For their conduct during the campaign in the Soviet Union the President of Italy awarded on 31 December 1947 to the two infantry regiments of the 2nd Infantry Division "Sforzesca" Italy's highest military honor, the Gold Medal of Military Valour.

  53rd Infantry Regiment "Sforzesca" on 31 December 1947
  54th Infantry Regiment "Sforzesca" on 31 December 1947

Commanding officers 
The division's commanding officers were:

 Generale di Divisione Fidenzio Dall'Ora (1935 - 20 April 1938)
 Generale di Divisione Luigi Mentasti (21 April 1938 - 7 September 1939)
 Generale di Divisione Alfonso Ollearo (8 September 1939 - 28 June 1941)
 Generale di Divisione Carlo Pellegrini (29 June 1941 - 15 February 1943)
 Generale di Brigata Michele Vaccaro (acting: 16 February 1943 - 28 June 1943; official: 29 June 1943 - 9 September 1943)

Notes

References 

 

Infantry divisions of Italy in World War II
Italian military units and formations of the Greco-Italian War
Military units and formations established in 1940
Military units and formations disestablished in 1943